is a recurring fictional horse in The Legend of Zelda series of video games that debuted in The Legend of Zelda: Ocarina of Time. She was created by Yoshiaki Koizumi as the main form of transportation and steed of Link, the series protagonist. Her name is derived from the Celtic goddess of horses of the same name. Epona appears in several main titles in The Legend of Zelda series, including Majora's Mask, Twilight Princess and Breath of the Wild. She also appears in the spin-off title Hyrule Warriors and other game series.

Concept and creation
Epona was created by Yoshiaki Koizumi for the 1998 game The Legend of Zelda: Ocarina of Time. The development team had originally discussed the idea of including a horse during the development of Super Mario 64. Epona shares the same name with the Celtic goddess of horses. Koizumi stated that Epona is female. She was designed to autojump over obstacles because Shigeru Miyamoto wanted the game to be free of any difficult actions. Her riding mechanism was designed to include a carrot system, which Miyamoto introduced to make the game more fun. The system was designed to feature a whip to make Epona move faster, until all carrot icons had disappeared. The whip was later removed from the riding mechanism by the game's release. 

The introduction of a horse as Link's main mode of transport was an important factor in the development of Ocarina of Time. The game offers a large open world for the player to explore, with an area named Hyrule Field as its centrepiece. Epona was a turning point in the game's development. Miyamoto stated: "The moment that we saw you could ride around on a horse in 3D, we instantly realised that we needed a giant field that people could ride through".

Epona gives Link the ability to traverse the game environment with greater speed. In an interview in The Legend of Zelda: Ocarina of Time Encyclopedia, Miyamoto also explained: "The reason we chose a horse is because we wanted the vehicle, or mode of transportation, to be something that brought you into contact with others. That choice is also a reflection of the staff's understanding of what "Zelda-ness" means, to be sure". In an interview with Nintendo Power, series producer Eiji Aonuma also commented: "If I said we included Epona because Miyamoto likes horses, that would be oversimplifying it, but that was actually the biggest factor. He wanted Ocarina to be unique, and realized that there weren't any other games that involved riding a horse".

A N64 development cartridge for F-Zero X that contained a 1997 Zelda build showed that a Reed Whistle item was originally used to summon Epona before being replaced by "Epona's Song".

Epona was planned to be nameable by players in Ocarina of Time, but the feature was removed before its release. The feature was later added to The Legend of Zelda: Twilight Princess. During the development of Twilight Princess, Aonuma would not confirm whether or not the horse was indeed Epona.

After receiving a fan's feedback that the experience of riding Epona in a large world was missed in Skyward Sword, Aonuma said that he felt the same and so considered this for Breath of the Wild.

Appearances

The Legend of Zelda series 
Epona first appears in The Legend of Zelda: Ocarina of Time as a filly at the Lon Lon Ranch, personally handled by a young girl named Malon. She teaches Link a song that attracts Epona and serves as a device for summoning, called "Epona's Song". When Link is transported seven years into the future, Epona is a full grown mare and can be ridden, but will only come if her song is played.

Epona reappears as a filly in The Legend of Zelda: Majora's Mask, in which she accompanies Link on his journey, only to be kidnapped by a creature called Skull Kid. She is later recovered by Link at Romani Ranch within the parallel dimension known as Termina.

Link appears riding an unnamed horse, bearing resemblance to Epona, in the introductions for both The Legend of Zelda: Oracle of Seasons and Oracle of Ages.

Epona makes an appearance in The Legend of Zelda: Four Swords Adventures, where she aids Link by giving him the ability to run over enemies on horseback. 

She again appears in a minor role as a non-playable character in The Legend of Zelda: The Minish Cap, along with her owner, Malon.

In The Legend of Zelda: Twilight Princess, Epona is owned by Link from the outset. Once the player learns how to mount and control her, she is ridden by Link in mounted combat sequences as he fends off multiple enemies. Epona can jump over obstacles and be spurred on to move faster, but has limited stamina.

Epona appears in The Legend of Zelda: Breath of the Wild, wherein she automatically avoids obstacles, allowing the player to concentrate on other tasks, such as shooting arrows. Link can leap off her and enter bullet time to better aim his bow at enemies. She can only be obtained by scanning a specific amiibo with the amiibo rune, before being registered at a stable.

Other game series 
In Hyrule Warriors, Epona appears as a weapon for Link via downloadable content (DLC), allowing him to battle enemies on horseback. Epona's weapon class, Horse, provides several versions: Epona, Twilight Epona, Epona of Time and Epona of Time +.

The Ocarina of Time incarnation of Epona appears in Super Smash Bros. Brawl and Super Smash Bros. for Nintendo 3DS as a sticker and trophy, respectively. 

For the 30th anniversary of The Legend of Zelda series, several amiibo were released that are compatible with Animal Crossing: New Leaf. One of these amiibo figures of Link summons Epona into the game as a village character.

A Zelda crossover for Monster Hunter Stories enables the player to dress as Link with his outfit and weapons and ride Epona.

Epona makes an appearance in Kingdom Come: Deliverance as an Easter egg.

Reception
Epona has received a positive reception since her debut. Honest Gamers commented that the world of Ocarina of Time seemed to be designed for Epona, instead of the other way around. GameDaily listed Epona as one of their top 25 of Nintendo's gimmicks, stating that through Epona, Nintendo had provided gamers with a means of enacting the childhood dream of riding a horse. They also mentioned that seeing Epona in Twilight Princess made them "squeal like fanboys". According to GameDaily the sight of Epona being revealed in The Legend of Zelda: Twilight Princess was enough to make some people cry.  

IGN compared the smooth run of the horses in Gallop Racer 3D to that of Epona in Ocarina of Time, saying that this smoothness in riding helped her win over the hearts of millions. Gaming Age commented that it was obvious the developers had spent a great deal of effort on her and praised the improvements on her design and animation since Ocarina of Time. Before the release of Twilight Princess, IGN's Matt Casamassina expressed hopes of an expansion of the horseback combat abilities available in Ocarina of Time.

UGO listed Epona 15th on their list of "NPC Characters We Love Having By Our Side", commenting that "she is easily the best horse in all of gamedom". After Aonuma revealed that Epona would appear in Breath of the Wild, Looper's John Martin responded positively by commenting: "If she's indeed resurrected as an actual mount in the game, then no amount of carrots will be able to measure our joy".

In a 2008 MTV vote for the best video game horse, Epona was named the victor based on the four judges, including Ken Levine, Mike Krahulik, and Leigh Alexander; she also placed second in the readers' choice award. In 2010, Ben Reeves of Game Informer ranked Epona in top position of a list of the top ten horses in video games, commenting that "Epona left quite a mark on our young, impressionable minds". Julie Muncy writing for Wired remarked that Epona's role in Majora's Mask is to be an ally to the player, giving players the sense that they are not alone within the game world, and described this as the "emotional core of Link's connection to Epona". In 2022, senior editor of Shacknews, Ozzie Mejia included Epona on a list of favourite video game horses of all time stating that "Nintendo has gradually worked in more horseback riding with every Epona appearance and it's made players feel like she's grown right alongside them". Blast Magazine named Epona as the greatest video game horse of all time, saying that she is "probably the most recognizable and beloved equine in all of video games, Epona has worked her way into the hearts of gamers worldwide".

See also 
 Characters of The Legend of Zelda

Notes

References

Animal characters in video games
Female characters in video games
Fictional horses
Nintendo protagonists
The Legend of Zelda characters
Video game sidekicks
Video game characters introduced in 1998